The GWR 633 Class were s designed by George Armstrong and built at the Wolverhampton railway works of the Great Western Railway between November 1871 and April 1872. These were always southern division locomotives but over the years some were fitted to work the metropolitan lines and played a large role in the transportation of goods from Acton to Smithfield. The weight was 34 tons 12 cwt. There were twelve locomotives, numbered 633–644.

Modifications
Nos.  643 and 644 were fitted with condensing apparatus when built, for working on the Metropolitan Railway Widened Lines and this was added to some others in the 1890s. These were the first size-coupled engines to be accepted for the widened lines. The class was reboilered again with Belpaire fireboxes (but not pannier tanks) between 1916 and 1925. 633, 634, and all the others fitted with condensers were sent to the London Division and were cabless to work through then metropolitan tunnels. The ones not fitted with condensers were fitted with a cab and allocated to South Wales.

Service
They were intended for the Southern Division of the GWR. The condenser-fitted engines worked in the London area, others at Neath in South Wales. Withdrawal took place in 1928-34.

References

Sources

0633
GWR 0633
GWR 0633
Railway locomotives introduced in 1871
Standard gauge steam locomotives of Great Britain